The Disston Mansion is a house in North Philadelphia. It was the residence of Albert H. Disston, who died on October 21, 1883, at the age of 34. Disston was the son of Henry Disston, the founder of the Disston saw company, for which the younger Disston worked. In its notice of Disston's death, the Pittsburgh Commercial Gazette called the house "palatial" and said it was constructed "at a cost of at least $150,000".

The architect Edwin Forrest Durang designed the building. Durang was best known as an architect of churches, and designed only a few homes.

In 2018, two stained glass windows were stolen from the house.

References

Houses in Philadelphia